The Last Shadow is a 2021 science fiction novel by American writer Orson Scott Card, part of his Ender's Game series. It links the Shadow Saga (the parallel companion series) back to the original Ender series. This book brings the two series back together, and wraps up some of the plot threads left dangling in Shadow of the Giant (the fourth book in the Shadow Saga). The events in the book follow those in Children of the Mind, the final book in the Ender series.

Card has said that he began writing the first pages of the novel while quarantined during the COVID-19 pandemic. The novel was originally set to be titled Shadows in Flight, but Card decided to swap titles with the fifth book in the Shadow series (released on 17 January 2012), which serves as a bridge to the final book. The concluding events of Shadows in Flight were initially planned for the first chapter of the final book, with working title Shadows Alive.

See also

List of Ender's Game characters
List of works by Orson Scott Card

References 

American science fiction novels
Ender's Game series books